The Girl Who Played Go, originally published as La Joueuse de Go, is a 2001 French novel by Shan Sa set during the Japanese occupation of Manchuria. It tells the story of a 16-year-old Chinese girl who is exceptionally good at the game of Go, and her game with a young Japanese officer. It was translated into English in 2003 and has been translated into 32 languages in total.

The novel won a number of prizes, including the Prix Goncourt des Lycéens (Prix Goncourt of the High-school students) in 2001 and the Kiriyama Prize for fiction in 2004.

In 2004, the novel was adapted into a German stage production which premiered at Freies Werkstatt Theater.

References 

2001 French novels
Prix Goncourt winning works
Go books
French novels adapted into plays
Novels set in the 1930s
Novels set in Manchukuo
Novels set in Liaoning
Novels set in Heilongjiang
Novels set in Tokyo
Novels by Shan Sa